Jerome Lester Horwitz (October 22, 1903 – January 18, 1952), better known by his stage name Curly Howard, was an American comedian and actor. He was best known as a member of the American comedy team the Three Stooges, which also featured his elder brothers Moe and Shemp Howard and actor Larry Fine. In early shorts, he was billed as Curley.  Curly Howard was generally considered the most popular and recognizable of the Stooges.

He was well known for his high-pitched voice and vocal expressions ("nyuk-nyuk-nyuk!", "woob-woob-woob!", "soitenly!" [certainly], "I'm a victim of soikemstance" [circumstance], and barking like a dog), as well as his physical comedy (e.g., falling on the ground and pivoting on his shoulder as he "walked" in circular motion), improvisations, and athleticism. An untrained actor, Curly borrowed (and significantly exaggerated) the "woob woob" from "nervous" and soft-spoken comedian Hugh Herbert. Curly's unique version of "woob-woob-woob" was firmly established by the time of the Stooges' second Columbia film, Punch Drunks (1934).

Howard had to leave the Three Stooges act in May 1946 when a massive stroke ended his show business career. He suffered serious health problems and several more strokes until his death in 1952 at age 48.

Early life
Curly Howard was born Jerome Lester Horwitz in the Bensonhurst section of the Brooklyn borough of New York City, on October 22, 1903. Of Lithuanian Jewish ancestry, he was the youngest of the five sons of Jennie (Gorovitz) and Solomon Horwitz. Because he was the youngest, his brothers called him "Babe" to tease him. The name "Babe" stuck with him all his life. However, when his elder brother Shemp Howard married Gertrude Frank, who was also nicknamed "Babe", the brothers called him "Curly" to avoid confusion. His full formal Hebrew name was "Yehudah Leib bar Shlomo Natan HaLevi".

A quiet child, Howard rarely caused problems for his parents (something in which older brothers Moe and Shemp excelled). He was a mediocre student, but excelled as an athlete on the school basketball team. He did not graduate high school; instead, he kept himself busy with odd jobs and constantly following his older brothers, whom he idolized. He was also an accomplished ballroom dancer and singer and regularly turned up at the Triangle Ballroom in Brooklyn, occasionally bumping into actor George Raft.

When Howard was 12, he accidentally shot himself in the left ankle while cleaning a rifle. Moe rushed him to the hospital, saving his life, but the wound resulted in a noticeably thinner left leg and a slight limp. Curly was so afraid of surgery that he never had the limp corrected. While with the Stooges, he developed his famous exaggerated walk to conceal the limp on screen.

Howard was interested in music and comedy and watched his brothers Shemp and Moe perform as stooges in Ted Healy's vaudeville act. He also liked to hang around backstage, although he never participated in any of the routines.

Career

Early career and the Three Stooges
Howard married his first wife, Julia Rosenthal, on August 5, 1930, but the marriage was annulled shortly afterward.

Howard's first on-stage break was as a comedy musical conductor in 1928 for the Orville Knapp Band. Moe later recalled that his performances usually overshadowed those of the band. Though he enjoyed the gig, he watched as brothers Moe and Shemp with partner Larry Fine made it big as some of Ted Healy's "Stooges". Vaudeville star Healy had a very popular stage act, in which he would try to tell jokes or sing, only to have his stooges wander on stage and interrupt or heckle him and cause disturbances from the audience. Meanwhile, Healy and company appeared in their first feature film, Rube Goldberg's Soup to Nuts (1930).

Shemp Howard, however, soon tired of Healy's abrasiveness, bad temper, and alcoholism. In 1932, he was offered a contract at the Vitaphone Studios in Brooklyn. With Shemp gone, Moe suggested that Curly fill the third stooge role, but Healy felt that with his thick, chestnut hair and elegant waxed mustache, he looked too good for the part. Howard left the room and returned minutes later with his head shaven (the mustache remained very briefly). In one of the few interviews Curly Howard gave in his lifetime, he complained about the loss of his hair: "I had to shave it off right down to the skin." 

In 1934, MGM was building Healy up as a solo comedian in feature films, and Healy dissolved the act to pursue his career. Like Shemp, the new team of Moe, Larry, and Curly were weary of Healy's drinking and abrasive personality. That same year, with "The Three Stooges" as the act's new name, they signed to appear in two-reel comedy short subjects for Columbia Pictures. The Stooges soon became the most popular short-subject attraction, with Curly playing an integral part in the trio's work.

Prime years

Howard's childlike mannerisms and natural comedic charm made him a hit with audiences, particularly children. He was known in the act for having an "indestructible" head, which always won out by breaking anything that assaulted it, including saws (resulting in his characteristic quip, "Oh, look!"). Although Howard had no formal acting training, his comedic skills were exceptional. Often, directors let the camera roll freely and let Howard improvise. Jules White, in particular, left gaps in the Stooge scripts where he could improvise for several minutes. In later years, White commented: "If we wrote a scene and needed a little something extra, I'd say to Curly, 'Look, we've got a gap to fill this in with a "woob-woob" or some other bit of business', and he never disappointed us."

By the time the Stooges hit their peak in the late 1930s, their films had almost become vehicles for Howard's unbridled comic performances. Classics such as A Plumbing We Will Go (1940), We Want Our Mummy (1938), An Ache in Every Stake (1941), Cactus Makes Perfect (1942), and their most violent short, They Stooge to Conga (1943), display his ability to take inanimate objects (food, tools, pipes, etc.) and turn them into ingenious comic props. Moe Howard later confirmed that when Curly forgot his lines, that merely allowed him to improvise on the spot so that the "take" could continue uninterrupted:

Howard also developed a set of Brooklyn-accented reactions and expressions that the other Stooges would imitate long after he had left the act:
 "Nyuk, nyuk, nyuk" – Curly Howard's trademark laugh, accompanied by manic finger-snapping (snapping one finger, then the other before cupping your hand and slapping the other down), often used to amuse himself
 "Woob, woob, woob!" – cheering used when he was either happy, scared, dazed, or flirting with a "dame"
 "Hmmm!" – an under-the-breath, high-pitched sound meant to show frustration
 "Nyahh-ahhh-ahhh!" – a scared reaction (this was the reaction most often used by the other Stooges after Curly's departure)
 "La-Dee" or simply "La, la, laaa" – his singing used when he was acting innocently right before taking out an enemy
 "Ruff Ruff" – a dog bark, used to express anger, showing defiance, barking at an attractive dame, and/or giving an enemy a final push before departing the scene
 "Ha-cha-cha!" – a take on Jimmy Durante's catchphrase
 "I'm a victim of soikemstance! [circumstance]" – used to express uncertainty
 "Soitenly!" ("certainly")
 "I'll moider you!" ("I'll murder you!")
 "Huff huff huff!" – sharp, huffing exhales either due to excitement or meant to provoke a foe
 "Ah-ba-ba-ba-ba-ba-ba!" – used during his later years, a sort of nonsense, high-pitched yelling that signified being scared or overly excited
 "Indubitably" – an expression used to feign an intelligent response
 His teeth, while chattering nervously, made the sound of a small hammer striking a chisel
 "Oh! A WISE guy, eh?" – annoyed response
 "Oh, look!" – surprised remark, usually about an everyday object
 "Say a few syllables!" – to another (injured) Stooge, usually Moe
 Occasionally, the Stooges faced a problem that required deep thought, whereupon Curly would bang his head on a wall several times, then shout, "I got it!  I got it!"   Moe would ask, "What have you got?"  Curly's answer: "A terrific headache."
 Despite his mispronunciations, he had an uncanny ability to instantly spell big words, such as "chrysanthemum", if asked. The gag was that Curly never did it, when something important was at stake. In one scene, the Stooges were in a situation where this talent might have landed them a job, but Curly had missed his opportunity. Moe's reaction would be to growl, "Where were you a minute ago?" and then smack him.

On several occasions, Moe Howard was convinced that rising star Lou Costello (a close friend of Shemp's) was stealing material from his brother. Costello was known to acquire prints of the Stooges' films from Columbia Pictures on occasion, presumably to study him. Inevitably, Curly Howard's routines would appear in Abbott and Costello feature films, much to Moe's chagrin. (It did not help that Columbia Pictures president Harry Cohn would not allow the Stooges to make feature-length films like contemporaries Laurel and Hardy, the Marx Brothers, and Abbott and Costello.)

Curly was the only "third Stooge" who never made a series of his short films, without Moe or Larry, either before joining the Stooges or after leaving. Shemp and subsequent Stooges Joe Besser and Joe DeRita (referred to during his stint with the Stooges as "Curly Joe DeRita") each starred in their solo series of theatrical short subjects.

Illness

Slow decline
By 1944, Howard's energy began to wane. Films such as Idle Roomers (1944)  and Booby Dupes (1945) present a Curly whose voice was deeper and his actions slower. He may have suffered the first of many strokes between the filming of Idiots Deluxe (October 1944) and If a Body Meets a Body (March 1945). After the filming of the feature-length Rockin' in the Rockies (December 1944), he finally checked himself (at Moe Howard's insistence) into Cottage Hospital in Santa Barbara, California, on January 23, 1945, and was diagnosed with extreme hypertension, a retinal hemorrhage, and obesity. His ill health imposed a rest, leading to only five shorts being released in 1945 (the normal output was six to eight per year).

Moe Howard pleaded with Harry Cohn to allow his younger brother some time off upon discharge to regain his strength, but Cohn would not halt the production of his profitable Stooge shorts and flatly refused his request. The Stooges had five months off between August 1945 and January 1946. They used that time to book a two-month live performance commitment in New York City, working shows seven days a week. During their time on the East Coast, Howard met his third wife, Marion Buxbaum, whom he married on October 17, 1945, after a two-week courtship.

Returning to Los Angeles in late November 1945, Howard was a shell of his former self. With two months' rest, the team's 1946 schedule at Columbia commenced in late January, but involved only 24 days' work from February to early May. Despite eight weeks off in that same period, Howard's condition continued to deteriorate.

By early 1946, Howard's voice had become even more coarse than before, and remembering even the simplest dialogue was increasingly difficult. He had lost considerable weight, and lines had creased his face.

1946 stroke
Half-Wits Holiday (released 1947) was Howard's final appearance as an official member of the Stooges. During filming on May 6, 1946, he suffered a severe stroke while sitting in director Jules White's chair, waiting to film the last scene of the day. When called by the assistant director to take the stage, he did not answer. Moe looked for his brother; he found him with his head dropped to his chest. Moe later recalled that his mouth was distorted, and he was unable to speak, only able to cry. Moe immediately alerted White, leading the latter to rework the scene quickly, dividing the action between Moe and Larry while Curly was rushed to the hospital, where Moe joined him after the filming. Howard spent several weeks at the Motion Picture Country House in Woodland Hills before returning home for further recovery.

In January 1946, Shemp had been recruited to substitute for a resting Curly during live performances in New Orleans. After Curly's stroke, Shemp agreed to replace him in the Columbia shorts, but only until his younger brother was well enough to rejoin the act. An extant copy of the Stooges' 1947 Columbia Pictures contract was signed by all four Stooges and stipulated that Shemp's joining "in place and stead of Jerry Howard" would be only temporary until Curly recovered sufficiently to return to work full-time.

Howard, partially recovered and with his hair regrown, made a brief cameo appearance in January 1947 as a train passenger barking in his sleep in the third film after brother Shemp's return, Hold That Lion! (1947). It was the only film that featured Larry Fine and all three Howard brothers – Moe, Shemp, and Curly – simultaneously; director White later said he spontaneously staged the bit during Curly's impromptu visit to the soundstage:

In June 1948, Howard filmed a second cameo as an angry chef for the short Malice in the Palace (1949), but due to his illness, his performance was not deemed good enough, and his scenes were cut. A lobby card for the short shows him with the other Stooges, although he never appeared in the final release.

Retirement
Still not fully recovered from his stroke, Howard met Valerie Newman and married her on July 31, 1947. A friend, Irma Leveton, later recalled, "Valerie was the only decent thing that happened to Curly and the only one that really cared about him." Although his health continued to decline after the marriage, Valerie gave birth to a daughter, Janie, in 1948.

Later that year, Howard suffered a second massive stroke, which left him partially paralyzed. He used a wheelchair by 1950 and was fed boiled rice and apples as part of his diet to reduce his weight (and blood pressure). Valerie admitted him into the Motion Picture & Television Country House and Hospital on August 29, 1950. He was released after several months of treatment and medical tests, although he would return periodically until his death.

In February 1951, he was placed in a nursing home, where he suffered another stroke a month later. In April, he went to live at the North Hollywood Hospital and Sanitarium.

Final months and death

In December 1951, the North Hollywood Hospital and Sanitarium supervisor told the Howard family that Curly was becoming a problem to the nursing staff at the facility because of his mental deterioration. They admitted they could no longer care for him and suggested he be placed in a mental hospital. Moe refused and relocated him to the Baldy View Sanitarium in San Gabriel, California.

On January 7, 1952, Moe was contacted on the Columbia set while filming He Cooked His Goose to help move Curly for what would be the last time. This proved unsuccessful, and Curly died eleven days later, on January 18, 1952. He lived the shortest life of the Stooges, dying at the age of 48. He was given a Jewish funeral and was buried at the Western Jewish Institute section of Home of Peace Cemetery in East Los Angeles. His older brothers, Benjamin and Shemp (who died three years later), and parents Jennie and Solomon are all interred there, as well.

Personal life
Howard's offscreen personality was the antithesis of his onscreen manic persona. He generally kept to himself and was an introvert, rarely socializing with people unless he had been drinking (a habit to which he would increasingly turn as the stresses of his career grew). Howard refrained from engaging in the antics for which he became famous unless he was with family, performing for an audience, or intoxicated. He was known for his kindness to stray dogs.

Howard had four marriages and two children:
 Julia Rosenthal (m. August 5, 1930 – divorced January 6, 1931)
 Elaine Ackerman (m. June 7, 1937 – div. July 11, 1940)
 Marilyn Howard Server (b. 1938)
 Marion Buxbaum (m. October 17, 1945 – div. July 22, 1946)
 Valerie Newman (m. July 31, 1947 – January 18, 1952; his death)
 Janie Howard Hanky (b. 1948)

Howard's first marriage ended in divorce five months after the union occurred and before he achieved fame with the Stooges. Howard married his second wife, Elaine Ackerman, on June 7, 1937. Their union produced one child, Marilyn, the following year. The couple divorced in June 1940, after which he gained weight and developed hypertension. He was insecure about his shaved head, believing it made him unappealing to women. He increasingly drank to excess and caroused to cope with his feelings of inferiority. He took to wearing a hat in public to convey an image of masculinity, saying he felt like a little kid with his hair shaved off. Despite his low self-esteem, he was popular with women, particularly with those who wanted to take advantage of him. 

Moe's son-in-law Norman Maurer noted "he was a pushover for women. If a pretty girl went up to him and gave him a spiel, Curly would marry her. Then she would take his money and run off. It was the same when a real estate agent would come up and say 'I have a house for you'; Curly would sell his current home and buy another one."

During World War II, for seven months each year, the trio's filming schedule went on hiatus, allowing them to make personal appearances. The Stooges entertained service members constantly, and the intense work schedule took its toll on Howard's health. He never drank while performing in film or on stage (Moe would not permit it), but after the work day had ended, he would head out to nightclubs where he ate, drank, and caroused to excess to cope with the stress of work. He was a profligate spender, especially on wine, food, women, and homes, and was often near bankruptcy. Moe eventually helped him manage his finances and even filled out his income tax returns.

Howard found constant companionship in his dogs and often befriended strays whenever the Stooges traveled. He would pick up homeless dogs and take them with him from town to town until he found them a home somewhere else on the tour. When not performing, he usually had a few pet dogs waiting for him at home, as well.

Moe urged Curly to find himself a wife, hoping it would persuade his brother to finally settle down and allow his health to improve somewhat. After a two-week courtship, he married Marion Buxbaum on October 17, 1945, a union that lasted nine months. The divorce proceeding was bitter, exacerbated by exploitative, sensationalist media coverage, which worsened his already fragile health. The divorce was finalized in July 1946, two months after he suffered his career-ending stroke.

On July 31, 1947, he married Valerie Newman. They had one daughter, Janie (born in 1948), and remained married until his death.

Legacy
Curly Howard is considered by many fans and critics alike to be their favorite member of the Three Stooges. In a 1972 interview; Larry Fine recalled, "Personally, I thought Curly was the greatest because he was a natural comedian who had no formal training. Whatever he did, he made up on the spur of the moment. When we lost Curly, we took a hit." Curly's mannerisms, behavior, and personality along with his catchphrases of "n'yuk, n'yuk, n'yuk," "woob, woob, woob", and "soitenly!" have become a part of American popular culture. Steve Allen called him one of the "most original, yet seldom recognized comic geniuses."

The Ted Okuda and Edward Watz's book The Columbia Comedy Shorts puts Howard's appeal and legacy in critical perspective:

In popular culture
 The titular character of the Hanna-Barbera Saturday-morning cartoon series, Jabberjaw, is modeled after Curly. the character was voiced by Frank Welker.
The ABC television sketch comedy series Fridays (ABC, 1980-82) featured an occasional skit of "The Numb Boys" – essentially a Three Stooges routine related to a recent news topic – with John Roarke playing Curly (and Bruce Mahler as Moe and Larry David as Larry).
Curly's legend far outlived him when the otherwise-obscure country-pop Jump 'n the Saddle Band scored one of the biggest novelty hits of the 1980s with their 1983 single, "The Curly Shuffle". The video featured some of Curly's best scenes. One band member claimed they had watched hundreds of hours' worth of Three Stooges films to find the right ones.
In 2000, longtime Stooges fan Mel Gibson produced a television film for ABC about the lives and careers of the Stooges. In an interview promoting the film, he said Curly was his favorite of the Stooges. In the film; Curly was played by Michael Chiklis.
In the 2012 Farrelly brothers' film The Three Stooges, Will Sasso portrays Curly Howard. Robert Capron portrays young Curly.
In the children's novel series Captain Underpants and its film adaptation, the elementary school that the main characters attend is named Jerome Horwitz Elementary School, in Howard's honor.
One of Curly's grandsons, Bradley Server, performs at Stooge tribute shows under the moniker "Curly G", and has a YouTube channel named "Curly's Grandson".

Filmography

Features
 Turn Back the Clock (1933)
 Broadway to Hollywood (1933)
 Meet the Baron (1933)
 Dancing Lady (1933)
 Myrt and Marge (1933)
 Fugitive Lovers (1934)
 Hollywood Party (1934)
 The Captain Hates the Sea (1934)
 Start Cheering (1938)
 Time Out for Rhythm (1941)
 My Sister Eileen (1942)
 Good Luck, Mr. Yates (1943) (scenes deleted, reused in Gents Without Cents)
 Rockin' in the Rockies (1945)
 Swing Parade of 1946 (1946)
 Stop! Look! and Laugh! (1960) (scenes from Stooge shorts)

Short subjects

 Nertsery Rhymes (1933)
 Beer and Pretzels (1933)
 Hello Pop! (1933)
 Plane Nuts (1933)
 Roast Beef and Movies (1934)
 Jail Birds of Paradise (1934)
 Hollywood on Parade # B-9 (1934)
 Woman Haters (1934) (*credited as "Curley")
 The Big Idea (1934)
 Punch Drunks (1934) (*credited as "Curley")
 Men in Black (1934)
 Three Little Pigskins (1934)
 Horses' Collars (1935)
 Restless Knights (1935)
 Screen Snapshots Series 14, No. 6 (1935)
 Pop Goes the Easel (1935)
 Uncivil Warriors (1935)
 Pardon My Scotch (1935)
 Hoi Polloi (1935)
 Three Little Beers (1935)
 Ants in the Pantry (1936)
 Movie Maniacs (1936)
 Screen Snapshots Series 15, No. 7 (1936)
 Half Shot Shooters (1936)
 Disorder in the Court (1936)
 A Pain in the Pullman (1936)
 False Alarms (1936)
 Whoops, I'm an Indian! (1936)
 Slippery Silks (1936)
 Grips, Grunts and Groans (1937)
 Dizzy Doctors (1937)
 Three Dumb Clucks (1937)
 Back to the Woods (1937)
 Goofs and Saddles (1937)
 Cash and Carry (1937)
 Playing the Ponies (1937)
 The Sitter Downers (1937)
 Termites of 1938 (1938)
 Wee Wee Monsieur (1938)
 Tassels in the Air (1938)
 Healthy, Wealthy and Dumb (1938)
 Violent Is the Word for Curly (1938)
 Three Missing Links (1938)
 Mutts to You (1938)
 Flat Foot Stooges (1938)
 Three Little Sew and Sews (1939)
 We Want Our Mummy (1939)
 A Ducking They Did Go (1939)
 Screen Snapshots: Stars on Horseback (1939)
 Yes, We Have No Bonanza (1939)
 Saved by the Belle (1939)
 Calling All Curs (1939)
 Oily to Bed, Oily to Rise (1939)
 Three Sappy People (1939)
 You Nazty Spy! (1940)
 Screen Snapshots: Art and Artists (1940)
 Rockin' thru the Rockies (1940)
 A Plumbing We Will Go (1940)
 Nutty But Nice (1940)
 How High Is Up? (1940)
 From Nurse to Worse (1940)
 No Census, No Feeling (1940)
 Cookoo Cavaliers (1940)
 Boobs in Arms (1940)
 So Long Mr. Chumps (1941)
 Dutiful But Dumb (1941)
 All the World's a Stooge (1941)
 I'll Never Heil Again (1941)
 An Ache in Every Stake (1941)
 In the Sweet Pie and Pie (1941)
 Some More of Samoa (1941)
 Loco Boy Makes Good (1942)
 What's the Matador? (1942)
 Cactus Makes Perfect (1942)
 Matri-Phony (1942)
 Three Smart Saps (1942)
 Even as IOU (1942)
 Sock-a-Bye Baby (1942)
 They Stooge to Conga (1943)
 Dizzy Detectives (1943)
 Spook Louder (1943)
 Back from the Front (1943)
 Three Little Twirps (1943)
 Higher Than a Kite (1943)
 I Can Hardly Wait (1943)
 Dizzy Pilots (1943)
 Phony Express (1943)
 A Gem of a Jam (1943)
 Crash Goes the Hash (1944)
 Busy Buddies (1944)
 The Yoke's on Me (1944)
 Idle Roomers (1944)
 Gents Without Cents (1944)
 No Dough Boys (1944)
 Three Pests in a Mess (1945)
 Booby Dupes (1945)
 Idiots Deluxe (1945)
 If a Body Meets a Body (1945)
 Micro-Phonies (1945)
 Beer Barrel Polecats (1946)
 A Bird in the Head (1946)
 Uncivil War Birds (1946)
 The Three Troubledoers (1946)
 Monkey Businessmen (1946)
 Three Loan Wolves (1946)
 G.I. Wanna Home (1946)
 Rhythm and Weep (1946)
 Three Little Pirates (1946)
 Half-Wits Holiday (1947)
 Hold That Lion! (1947)
(cameo appearance)
 Malice in the Palace (1949) (cameo appearance, deleted)
 Booty and the Beast (1953, recycled footage from Hold That Lion! shortly after Curly's passing)

References
Notes

Further reading
 Cox, Steve and Terry, Jim (2006) One Fine Stooge: A Frizzy Life in Pictures. Cumberland House Publishing
 Howard, Moe (1972 Moe Howard & The 3 Stooges Citadel Press
 Maurer, Joan Howard (1988) Curly: An Illustrated Biography of the Superstooge. Citadel Press
 Solomon, Jon (2002) The Complete Three Stooges: The Official Filmography and Three Stooges Companion''. Comedy III Productions

External links

 Curly Howard at The Three Stooges Official Website
 
 
 
 Three Stooges Sued by Curly's Widow

1903 births
1952 deaths
20th-century American comedians
20th-century American male actors
American male comedians
American male comedy actors
American male film actors
American male stage actors
American male television actors
American people of Lithuanian-Jewish descent
Burials at Home of Peace Cemetery
Columbia Pictures contract players
Jewish American comedians
Jewish American male actors
Male actors from New York City
Metro-Goldwyn-Mayer contract players
People from Bensonhurst, Brooklyn
The Three Stooges members
Vaudeville performers